John Harlan Kim (born January 10, 1993) is an Australian actor of Korean descent. He is known for playing Ezekiel Jones on the 2014–2018 American adventure television series The Librarians.

Career
Kim's first audition was for the Tom Hanks–Steven Spielberg TV miniseries The Pacific, where he was given the role of a 14-year-old Japanese soldier in the episode "Okinawa".  Kim then spent two years finishing high school and playing the part of Dale "Macca" McGregor, a recurring character in the Australian soap opera Neighbours.

In 2014 Kim was cast in a starring role on the TNT adventure television series The Librarians as Ezekiel Jones, a thief and "master of technologies and fan of classic crimes, who enjoys playing the role of an international man of mystery", a role he played for four seasons. In 2019 he was cast as Greg Li, "a brilliant medical student", in The CW science-fiction television series Pandora.

Filmography

References

External links

Australian people of Korean descent
Living people
21st-century Australian male actors
Male actors from Melbourne
Australian male television actors
Male actors of Korean descent
1995 births
Australian people of Asian descent
Australian actors of Asian descent